Yousef Abad Seyrafi (also Romanized as Yousef Abad Seirafi; also known as Yousef Abad Seirafi) is a village in Ferdows Rural District of the Central District of Shahriar County, Tehran province, Iran. At the 2006 National Census, its population was 2,023 in 499 households. The following census in 2011 counted 2,351 people in 664 households. The latest census in 2016 showed a population of 5,308 people in 1,658 households; it was the largest village in its rural district.

Yousef Abad Seyrafi takes its name from the Seyrafi family of magnates who owned Yousef Abad and nearby Shahriar. They are credited with giving away lands to the Ministry of Post and Telegraph to bring communications infrastructure to the town. Yousef Abad Seyrafi was the site to a fortress which has been destroyed.

References 

Shahriar County

Populated places in Tehran Province

Populated places in Shahriar County